Kitab al-Musiqa al-Kabir is a treatise on music in  east by the medieval philosopher al-Farabi (872-950/951). The work prescribes different aspects of music such as maqamat, and is believed to be influenced by the Pythagorean theory of harmonic ratios. The book was translated into Hebrew by Joseph ben Judah ibn Aknin.

Content

Al-Farabi divided Kitab al-Musiqa al-Kabir into two treatises. The first treatise is composed of two parts; following the Aristotelian tradition, al-Farabi split his study of music into a theoretical and practical aspect. The first part, which consists of two discourses, is an introduction which establishes the theoretical principles of music and investigation into how sound is generated. The second part applies the theoretical principles established in the first part to the musical instruments that were in use during al-Farabi’s time, while also discussing musical intervals and different kinds of melodies. The second treatise was intended to be a commentary to the thought of previous theorists of music, but it is not extant.

References

External links
 World Music: Arab Classical at National Geographic

10th-century Arabic books
Music of the medieval Islamic world
Persian music
Al-Farabi